Induced stem cells (iSC) are stem cells derived from somatic, reproductive, pluripotent or other cell types by deliberate epigenetic reprogramming. They are classified as either totipotent (iTC), pluripotent (iPSC) or progenitor (multipotent – iMSC, also called an induced multipotent progenitor cell – iMPC) or unipotent – (iUSC) according to their developmental potential and degree of dedifferentiation. Progenitors are obtained by so-called direct reprogramming or directed differentiation and are also called induced somatic stem cells.

Three techniques are widely recognized:

 Transplantation of nuclei taken from somatic cells into an oocyte (egg cell) lacking its own nucleus (removed in lab)
 Fusion of somatic cells with pluripotent stem cells and
 Transformation of somatic cells into stem cells, using the genetic material encoding reprogramming protein factors, recombinant proteins; microRNA, a synthetic, self-replicating polycistronic RNA and low-molecular weight biologically active substances.

Natural processes  
In 1895 Thomas Morgan removed one of a frog's two blastomeres and found that amphibians are able to form whole embryos from the remaining part. This meant that the cells can change their differentiation pathway. In 1924 Spemann and Mangold demonstrated the key importance of cell–cell inductions during animal development. The reversible transformation of cells of one differentiated cell type to another is called metaplasia. This transition can be a part of the normal maturation process, or caused by an inducement.

One example is the transformation of iris cells to lens cells in the process of maturation and transformation of retinal pigment epithelium cells into the neural retina during regeneration in adult newt eyes. This process allows the body to replace cells not suitable to new conditions with more suitable new cells. In Drosophila imaginal discs, cells have to choose from a limited number of standard discrete differentiation states. The fact that transdetermination (change of the path of differentiation) often occurs for a group of cells rather than single cells shows that it is induced rather than part of maturation.

The researchers were able to identify the minimal conditions and factors that would be sufficient for starting the cascade of molecular and cellular processes to instruct pluripotent cells to organize the embryo. They showed that opposing gradients of bone morphogenetic protein (BMP) and Nodal, two transforming growth factor family members that act as morphogens, are sufficient to induce molecular and cellular mechanisms required to organize, in vivo or in vitro, uncommitted cells of the zebrafish blastula animal pole into a well-developed embryo.

Some types of mature, specialized adult cells can naturally revert to stem cells. For example, "chief" cells express the stem cell marker Troy. While they normally produce digestive fluids for the stomach, they can revert into stem cells to make temporary repairs to stomach injuries, such as a cut or damage from infection. Moreover, they can make this transition even in the absence of noticeable injuries and are capable of replenishing entire gastric units, in essence serving as quiescent "reserve" stem cells. Differentiated airway epithelial cells can revert into stable and functional stem cells in vivo.
After injury, mature terminally differentiated kidney cells dedifferentiate into more primordial versions of themselves and then differentiate into the cell types needing replacement in the damaged tissue Macrophages can self-renew by local proliferation of mature differentiated cells. In newts, muscle tissue is regenerated from specialized muscle cells that dedifferentiate and forget the type of cell they had been. This capacity to regenerate does not decline with age and may be linked to their ability to make new stem cells from muscle cells on demand.

A variety of nontumorigenic stem cells display the ability to generate multiple cell types. For instance, multilineage-differentiating stress-enduring (Muse) cells are stress-tolerant adult human stem cells that can self-renew. They form characteristic cell clusters in suspension culture that express a set of genes associated with pluripotency and can differentiate into endodermal, ectodermal and mesodermal cells both in vitro and in vivo.

Other well-documented examples of transdifferentiation and their significance in development and regeneration were described in detail.

Induced totipotent cells

SCNT-mediated

Induced totipotent cells can be obtained by reprogramming somatic cells with somatic-cell nuclear transfer (SCNT). The process involves sucking out the nucleus of a somatic (body) cell and injecting it into an oocyte that has had its nucleus removed

Using an approach based on the protocol outlined by Tachibana et al., hESCs can be generated by SCNT using dermal fibroblasts nuclei from both a middle-aged 35-year-old male and an elderly, 75-year-old male, suggesting that age-associated changes are not necessarily an impediment to SCNT-based nuclear reprogramming of human cells. Such reprogramming of somatic cells to a pluripotent state holds huge potentials for regenerative medicine. Unfortunately, the cells generated by this technology are potentially not completely protected from the immune system of the patient (donor of nuclei), because they have the same mitochondrial DNA, as a donor of oocytes, instead of the patients mitochondrial DNA. This reduces their value as a source for autologous stem cell transplantation therapy; as for the present, it is not clear whether it can induce an immune response of the patient upon treatment.

Induced androgenetic haploid embryonic stem cells can be used instead of sperm for cloning. These cells, synchronized in M phase and injected into the oocyte, can produce viable offspring.

These developments, together with data on the possibility of unlimited oocytes from mitotically active reproductive stem cells, offer the possibility of industrial production of transgenic farm animals. Repeated recloning of viable mice through a SCNT method that includes a histone deacetylase inhibitor, trichostatin, added to the cell culture medium, show that it may be possible to reclone animals indefinitely with no visible accumulation of reprogramming or genomic errors However, research into technologies to develop sperm and egg cells from stem cells raises bioethical issues.

Such technologies may also have far-reaching clinical applications for overcoming cytoplasmic defects in human oocytes. For example, the technology could prevent inherited mitochondrial disease from passing to future generations. Mitochondrial genetic material is passed from mother to child. Mutations can cause diabetes, deafness, eye disorders, gastrointestinal disorders, heart disease, dementia, and other neurological diseases. The nucleus from one human egg has been transferred to another, including its mitochondria, creating a cell that could be regarded as having two mothers. The eggs were then fertilised and the resulting embryonic stem cells carried the swapped mitochondrial DNA.
As evidence that the technique is safe, the author of this method points to the existence of the healthy monkeys that are now more than four years old – and are the product of mitochondrial transplants across different genetic backgrounds.

In late-generation telomerase-deficient (Terc−/−) mice, SCNT-mediated reprogramming mitigates telomere dysfunction and mitochondrial defects to a greater extent than iPSC-based reprogramming.

Other cloning and totipotent transformation achievements have been described.

Obtained without SCNT
Recently, some researchers succeeded in getting totipotent cells without the aid of SCNT. Totipotent cells were obtained using epigenetic factors such as oocyte germinal isoform of histone.
Reprogramming in vivo, by transitory induction of the four factors Oct4, Sox2, Klf4 and c-Myc in mice, confers totipotency features. Intraperitoneal injection of such in vivo iPS cells generates embryo-like structures that express embryonic and extraembryonic (trophectodermal) markers.
The developmental potential of mouse pluripotent stem cells to yield both embryonic and extra-embryonic lineages also can be expanded by microRNA miR-34a deficiency, leading to strong induction of endogenous retroviruses MuERV-L (MERVL).

Rejuvenation to iPSCs

iPSc were first obtained in the form of transplantable teratocarcinoma induced by grafts taken from mouse embryos. Teratocarcinoma formed from somatic cells. Genetically mosaic mice were obtained from malignant teratocarcinoma cells, confirming the cells' pluripotency. It turned out that teratocarcinoma cells are able to maintain a culture of pluripotent embryonic stem cell in an undifferentiated state, by supplying the culture medium with various factors. In the 1980s, it became clear that transplanting pluripotent/embryonic stem cells into the body of adult mammals, usually leads to the formation of teratomas, which can then turn into a malignant tumor teratocarcinoma. However, putting teratocarcinoma cells into the embryo at the blastocyst stage caused them to become incorporated in the inner cell mass and often produced a normal chimeric (i.e. composed of cells from different organisms) animal. This indicated that the cause of the teratoma is a dissonance - mutual miscommunication between young donor cells and surrounding adult cells (the recipient's so-called "niche").

In August 2006, Japanese researchers circumvented the need for an oocyte, as in SCNT. By reprograming mouse embryonic fibroblasts into pluripotent stem cells via the ectopic expression of four transcription factors, namely Oct4, Sox2, Klf4 and c-Myc, they proved that the overexpression of a small number of factors can push the cell to transition to a new stable state that is associated with changes in the activity of thousands of genes.

Reprogramming mechanisms are thus linked, rather than independent, and are centered on a small number of genes.
IPSC properties are very similar to ESCs. iPSCs have been shown to support the development of all-iPSC mice using a tetraploid (4n) embryo, the most stringent assay for developmental potential. However, some genetically normal iPSCs failed to produce all-iPSC mice because of aberrant epigenetic silencing of the imprinted Dlk1-Dio3 gene cluster.  A team headed by Hans Schöler (who discovered the Oct4 gene back in 1989) showed that Oct4 overexpression drives massive off-target gene activation during reprogramming deteriorating the quality of iPSCs. Compared to OSKM (Oct4, Sox2, Klf4 and c-Myc) that show abnormal imprinting and differentiation patterns, SKM (Sox2, Klf4 and c-Myc) reprogramming generates iPSCs with high developmental potential (nearly 20-fold higher than that of OSKM) equivalent to embryonic stem cell, as determined by their ability to generate all-iPSC mice through tetraploid embryo complementation.

An important advantage of iPSC over ESC is that they can be derived from adult cells, rather than from embryos. Therefore, it becomes possible to obtain iPSC from adult and even elderly patients.

Reprogramming somatic cells into iPSCs leads to rejuvenation. It was found that reprogramming leads to telomere lengthening and subsequent shortening after their differentiation back into fibroblast-like derivatives. Thus, reprogramming leads to the restoration of embryonic telomere length, and hence increases the potential number of cell divisions otherwise limited by the Hayflick limit.

However, because of the dissonance between rejuvenated cells and the surrounding niche of the recipient's older cells, the injection of his own iPSC usually leads to an immune response, which can be used for medical purposes, or the formation of tumors such as teratoma. A hypothesized reason is that some cells differentiated from ESCs and iPSCs in vivo continue to synthesize embryonic protein isoforms. So, the immune system might detect and attack cells that are not cooperating properly.

A small molecule called MitoBloCK-6 can force the pluripotent stem cells to die by triggering apoptosis (via cytochrome c release across the mitochondrial outer membrane) in human pluripotent stem cells, but not in differentiated cells. Shortly after differentiation, daughter cells became resistant to death. When MitoBloCK-6 was introduced to differentiated cell lines, the cells remained healthy. The key to their survival was hypothesized to be due to the changes undergone by pluripotent stem cell mitochondria in the process of cell differentiation. This ability of MitoBloCK-6 to separate the pluripotent and differentiated cell lines has the potential to reduce the risk of teratomas and other problems in regenerative medicine.

In 2012, other small molecules (selective cytotoxic inhibitors of human pluripotent stem cells – hPSCs) were identified that prevented human pluripotent stem cells from forming teratomas in mice. The most potent and selective compound of them (PluriSIn #1) inhibits stearoyl-coA desaturase (the key enzyme in oleic acid biosynthesis), which finally results in apoptosis. With the help of this molecule, the undifferentiated cells can be selectively removed from culture. An efficient strategy to selectively eliminate pluripotent cells with teratoma potential is targeting pluripotent stem cell-specific antiapoptotic factor(s) (i.e., survivin or Bcl10). A single treatment with chemical survivin inhibitors (e.g., quercetin or YM155) can induce selective and complete cell death of undifferentiated hPSCs and is claimed to be sufficient to prevent teratoma formation after transplantation. However, it is unlikely that any kind of preliminary clearance is able to secure the replanting of iPSCs or ESCs. After the selective removal of pluripotent cells, they re-emerge quickly by reverting differentiated cells into stem cells, which leads to tumors. This may be due to the disorder of let-7 regulation of its target Nr6a1 (also known as Germ cell nuclear factor - GCNF), an embryonic transcriptional repressor of pluripotency genes that regulates gene expression in adult fibroblasts following micro-RNA miRNA loss.

Teratoma formation by pluripotent stem cells may be caused by low activity of PTEN enzyme, reported to promote the survival of a small population (0.1–5% of total population) of highly tumorigenic, aggressive, teratoma-initiating embryonic-like carcinoma cells during differentiation. The survival of these teratoma-initiating cells is associated with failed repression of Nanog, as well as a propensity for increased glucose and cholesterol metabolism. These teratoma-initiating cells also expressed a lower ratio of p53/p21 when compared to non-tumorigenic cells.
In connection with the above safety problems, the use of iPSCs for cell therapy is still limited. However, they can be used for a variety of other purposes, including the modeling of disease, screening (selective selection) of drugs, and toxicity testing of various drugs.

The tissue grown from iPSCs, placed in the "chimeric" embryos in the early stages of mouse development, practically do not cause an immune response (after the embryos have grown into adult mice) and are suitable for autologous transplantation
At the same time, full reprogramming of adult cells in vivo within tissues by transitory induction of the four factors Oct4, Sox2, Klf4 and c-Myc in mice results in teratomas emerging from multiple organs. Furthermore, partial reprogramming of cells toward pluripotency in vivo in mice demonstrates that incomplete reprogramming entails epigenetic changes (failed repression of Polycomb targets and altered DNA methylation) in cells that drive cancer development. However, a number of researchers later managed to carry out cyclical partial reprogramming in vivo by expression of the Yamanaka factors for a short period of time without subsequent carcinogenesis, thus partially rejuvenating and extending lifespan in 
physiologically aging wild-type mice and progeroid mice. With in vitro method employing slightly longer periods of reprogramming (to substantially rejuvenate) cells temporarily lose their cell identity but "reacquire their initial somatic fate when the reprogramming factors are withdrawn".

Chemical inducement 

By using solely small molecules, Deng Hongkui and colleagues demonstrated that endogenous "master genes" are enough for cell fate reprogramming. They induced a pluripotent state in adult cells from mice using seven small-molecule compounds.
The method's effectiveness is quite high: it was able to convert 0.02% of the adult tissue cells into iPSCs, which is comparable to the gene insertion conversion rate.
The authors note that the mice generated from CiPSCs were "100% viable and apparently healthy for up to 6 months". So, this chemical reprogramming strategy has potential use in generating functional desirable cell types for clinical applications.

In 2015 a robust chemical reprogramming system was established with a yield up to 1,000-fold greater than that of the previously reported protocol. So, chemical reprogramming became a promising approach to manipulate cell fates.

Differentiation from induced teratoma 

The fact that human iPSCs are capable of forming teratomas not only in humans but also in some animal body, in particular mice or pigs, allowed researchers to develop a method for differentiation of iPSCs in vivo. For this purpose, iPSCs with an agent for inducing differentiation into target cells are injected to a genetically modified pig or mouse that has suppressed immune system activation on human cells.
The formed teratoma is cut out and used for the isolation of the necessary differentiated human cells by means of monoclonal antibody to tissue-specific markers on the surface of these cells. This method has been successfully used for the production of functional myeloid, erythroid, and lymphoid human cells suitable for transplantation (yet only to mice).
Mice engrafted with human iPSC teratoma-derived hematopoietic cells produced human B and T cells capable of functional immune responses. These results offer hope that in vivo generation of patient customized cells is feasible, providing materials that could be useful for transplantation, human antibody generation, and drug screening applications.
Using MitoBloCK-6 and/or PluriSIn # 1 the differentiated progenitor cells can be further purified from teratoma forming pluripotent cells. The fact that the differentiation takes place even in the teratoma niche offers hope that the resulting cells are sufficiently stable to stimuli able to cause their transition back to the dedifferentiated (pluripotent) state and therefore safe. A similar in vivo differentiation system, yielding engraftable hematopoietic stem cells from mouse and human iPSCs in teratoma-bearing animals in combination with a maneuver to facilitate hematopoiesis, was described by Suzuki et al. They noted that neither leukemia nor tumors were observed in recipients after intravenous injection of iPSC-derived hematopoietic stem cells into irradiated recipients. Moreover, this injection resulted in multilineage and long-term reconstitution of the hematolymphopoietic system in serial transfers. Such a system provides a useful tool for practical application of iPSCs in the treatment of hematologic and immunologic diseases.

For further development of this method, animals (such as a mice) in which the human cell graft is grown must have modified genome such that all its cells express and have on its surface human SIRPα.
To prevent rejection after transplantation to the patient of the allogenic organ or tissue, grown from the pluripotent stem cells in vivo in the animal, these cells should express two molecules: CTLA4-Ig, which disrupts T cell costimulatory pathways and PD-L1, which activates T cell inhibitory pathway.

See also: .

Differentiated cell types

Retinal cells 

In the near-future, clinical trials designed to demonstrate the safety of the use of iPSCs for cell therapy of people with age-related macular degeneration, a disease causing blindness through retina damaging, will begin. There are several articles describing methods for producing retinal cells from iPSCs
and how to use them for cell therapy. Reports of iPSC-derived retinal pigmented epithelium transplantation showed enhanced
visual-guided behaviors of experimental animals for 6 weeks after transplantation. However, clinical trials have been successful: ten patients with retinitis pigmentosa have had eyesight restored, including a woman who had only 17 percent of her vision left.

Lung and airway epithelial cells 

Chronic lung diseases, such as idiopathic pulmonary fibrosis and cystic fibrosis or chronic obstructive pulmonary disease and asthma, are leading causes of morbidity and mortality worldwide, with a considerable human, societal, and financial burden. Therefore, there is an urgent need for effective cell therapy and lung tissue engineering.
Several protocols have been developed for generation of most cell types of the respiratory system, which may be useful for deriving patient-specific therapeutic cells.

Reproductive cells 

Some lines of iPSCs have the potential to differentiate into male germ cells and oocyte-like cells in an appropriate niche (by culturing in retinoic acid and porcine follicular fluid differentiation medium or seminiferous tubule transplantation). Moreover, iPSC transplantation contributes to repairing the testis of infertile mice, demonstrating the potential of gamete derivation from iPSCs in vivo and in vitro.

Induced progenitor stem cells

Direct transdifferentiation 

The risk of cancer and tumors creates the need to develop methods for safer cell lines suitable for clinical use. An alternative approach is so-called "direct reprogramming" – transdifferentiation of cells without passing through the pluripotent state. The basis for this approach was that 5-azacytidine – a DNA demethylation reagent – can cause the formation of myogenic, chondrogenic, and adipogeni clones in an immortal cell line of mouse embryonic fibroblasts and that the activation of a single gene, later named MyoD1, is sufficient for such reprogramming. Compared with iPSCs whose reprogramming requires at least two weeks, the formation of induced progenitor cells sometimes occurs within a few days and the efficiency of reprogramming is usually many times higher. This reprogramming does not always require cell division. The cells resulting from such reprogramming are more suitable for cell therapy because they do not form teratomas.
For example, Chandrakanthan et al., & Pimanda describe the generation of tissue-regenerative multipotent stem cells (iMS cells) by treating mature bone and fat cells transiently with a growth factor (platelet-derived growth factor–AB (PDGF-AB)) and 5-Azacytidine. These authors state that "Unlike primary mesenchymal stem cells, which are used with little objective evidence in clinical practice to promote tissue repair, iMS cells contribute directly to in vivo tissue regeneration in a context-dependent manner without forming tumors" and thus "has significant scope for application in tissue regeneration".

Single transcription factor transdifferentiation 

Originally, only early embryonic cells could be coaxed into changing their identity. Mature cells are resistant to changing their identity once they've committed to a specific kind. However, brief expression of a single transcription factor, the ELT-7 GATA factor, can convert the identity of fully differentiated, specialized non-endodermal cells of the pharynx into fully differentiated intestinal cells in intact larvae and adult roundworm Caenorhabditis elegans with no requirement for a dedifferentiated intermediate.

Transdifferentiation with CRISPR-mediated activator 

The cell fate can be effectively manipulated by epigenome editing, in particular via the direct activation of specific endogenous gene expression with CRISPR-mediated activator. When dCas9 (which has been modified so that it no longer cuts DNA, but still can be guided to specific sequences and to bind to them) is combined with transcription activators, it can precisely manipulate endogenous gene expression. Using this method, Wei et al., enhanced the expression of endogenous Cdx2 and Gata6 genes by CRISPR-mediated activators, thus directly converting mouse embryonic stem cells into two extraembryonic lineages, i.e., typical trophoblast stem cells and extraembryonic endoderm cells.  An analogous approach was used to induce activation of the endogenous Brn2, Ascl1, and Myt1l genes to convert mouse embryonic fibroblasts to induced neuronal cells.  Thus, transcriptional activation and epigenetic remodeling of endogenous master transcription factors are sufficient for conversion between cell types. The rapid and sustained activation of endogenous genes in their native chromatin context by this approach may facilitate reprogramming with transient methods that avoid genomic integration and provides a new strategy for overcoming epigenetic barriers to cell fate specification.

Phased process modeling regeneration 

Another way of reprogramming is the simulation of processes that occur during amphibian limb regeneration. In urodele amphibians, an early step in limb regeneration is skeletal muscle fiber dedifferentiation into a cellulate that proliferates into limb tissue. However, sequential small molecule treatment of the muscle fiber with myoseverin, reversine (the aurora B kinase inhibitor), and some other chemicals (BIO (glycogen synthase-3 kinase inhibitor), lysophosphatidic acid (pleiotropic activator of G-protein-coupled receptors), SB203580 (p38 MAP kinase inhibitor), or SQ22536 (adenylyl cyclase inhibitor)) causes the formation of new muscle cell types as well as other cell types such as precursors to fat, bone, and nervous system cells.

Antibody-based transdifferentiation 

The researchers discovered that GCSF-mimicking antibody can activate a growth-stimulating receptor on marrow cells in a way that induces marrow stem cells which normally develop into white blood cells to become neural progenitor cells. The technique enables researchers to search large libraries of antibodies and quickly select the ones with a desired biological effect.

Reprograming by bacteria 
The human gastrointestinal tract is colonized by a vast community of symbionts and commensals. The researchers demonstrate the phenomenon of somatic cell reprograming by bacteria and generation of multipotential cells from adult human dermal fibroblast cells by incorporating  Lactic acid bacteria   This cellular transdifferentiation is caused by ribosomes and "can occur via donor bacteria that are swallowed and digested by host cells, which may induce ribosomal stress and stimulate cellular developmental plasticity".

Conditionally reprogrammed cells 

Schlegel and Liu demonstrated that the combination of feeder cells and a Rho kinase inhibitor (Y-27632)  induces normal and tumor epithelial cells from many tissues to proliferate indefinitely in vitro. This process occurs without the need for transduction of exogenous viral or cellular genes. These cells have been termed "Conditionally Reprogrammed Cells (CRC)". The induction of CRCs is rapid and results from reprogramming of the entire cell population. CRCs do not express high levels of proteins characteristic of iPSCs or embryonic stem cells (ESCs) (e.g., Sox2, Oct4, Nanog, or Klf4). This induction of CRCs is reversible and removal of Y-27632 and feeders allows the cells to differentiate normally. CRC technology can generate 2 cells in 5 to 6 days from needle biopsies and can generate cultures from cryopreserved tissue and from fewer than four viable cells. CRCs retain a normal karyotype and remain nontumorigenic. This technique also efficiently establishes cell cultures from human and rodent tumors.

The ability to rapidly generate many tumor cells from small biopsy specimens and frozen tissue provides significant opportunities for cell-based diagnostics and therapeutics (including chemosensitivity testing) and greatly expands the value of biobanking. Using CRC technology, researchers were able to identify an effective therapy for a patient with a rare type of lung tumor. Engleman's group describes a pharmacogenomic platform that facilitates rapid discovery of drug combinations which can overcome resistance using CRC system. In addition, the CRC method allows for the genetic manipulation of epithelial cells ex vivo and their subsequent evaluation in vivo in the same host. While initial studies revealed that co-culturing epithelial cells with Swiss 3T3 cells J2 was essential for CRC induction, with transwell culture plates, physical contact between feeders and epithelial cells isn't required for inducing CRCs, and more importantly, irradiation of the feeder cells is required for this induction. Consistent with the transwell experiments, conditioned medium induces and maintains CRCs, which is accompanied by a concomitant increase of cellular telomerase activity. The activity of the conditioned medium correlates directly with radiation-induced feeder cell apoptosis. Thus, conditional reprogramming of epithelial cells is mediated by a combination of Y-27632 and a soluble factor(s) released by apoptotic feeder cells.

Riegel et al. demonstrate that mouse ME cells, isolated from normal mammary glands or from mouse mammary tumor virus (MMTV)-Neu–induced mammary tumors, can be cultured indefinitely as conditionally reprogrammed cells (CRCs). Cell surface progenitor-associated markers are rapidly induced in normal mouse ME-CRCs relative to ME cells. However, the expression of certain mammary progenitor subpopulations, such as CD49f+ ESA+ CD44+, drops significantly in later passages. Nevertheless, mouse ME-CRCs grown in a three-dimensional extracellular matrix gave rise to mammary acinar structures. ME-CRCs isolated from MMTV-Neu transgenic mouse mammary tumors express high levels of HER2/neu, as well as tumor-initiating cell markers, such as CD44+, CD49f+, and ESA+ (EpCam). These patterns of expression are sustained in later CRC passages. Early and late passage ME-CRCs from MMTV-Neu tumors that were implanted in the mammary fat pads of syngeneic or nude mice developed vascular tumors that metastasized within 6 weeks of transplantation. Importantly, the histopathology of these tumors was indistinguishable from that of the parental tumors that develop in the MMTV-Neu mice. Application of the CRC system to mouse mammary epithelial cells provides an attractive model system to study genetics and phenotype of normal and transformed mouse epithelium in a defined culture environment and for in vivo transplant studies.

A different approach to CRC is to inhibit CD47 – a membrane protein that is the thrombospondin-1 receptor. Loss of CD47 permits sustained proliferation of primary murine endothelial cells, increases asymmetric division, and enables these cells to spontaneously reprogram to form multipotent embryoid body-like clusters. CD47 knockdown acutely increases mRNA levels of c-Myc and other stem cell transcription factors in cells in vitro and in vivo. Thrombospondin-1 is a key environmental signal that inhibits stem cell self-renewal via CD47. Thus, CD47 antagonists enable cell self-renewal and reprogramming by overcoming negative regulation of c-Myc and other stem cell transcription factors. In vivo blockade of CD47 using an antisense morpholino increases survival of mice exposed to lethal total body irradiation due to increased proliferative capacity of bone marrow-derived cells and radioprotection of radiosensitive gastrointestinal tissues.

Lineage-specific enhancers 
Differentiated macrophages can self-renew in tissues and expand long-term in culture. Under certain conditions, macrophages can divide without losing features they have acquired while specializing into immune cells – which is usually not possible with differentiated cells. The macrophages achieve this by activating a gene network similar to one found in embryonic stem cells. Single-cell analysis revealed that, in vivo, proliferating macrophages can derepress a macrophage-specific enhancer repertoire associated with a gene network controlling self-renewal. This happened when concentrations of two transcription factors named MafB and c-Maf were naturally low or were inhibited for a short time. Genetic manipulations that turned off MafB and c-Maf in the macrophages caused the cells to start a self-renewal program. The similar network also controls embryonic stem cell self-renewal but is associated with distinct embryonic stem cell-specific enhancers.

Hence macrophages isolated from MafB- and c-Maf-double deficient mice divide indefinitely; the self-renewal depends on c-Myc and Klf4.

Indirect lineage conversion 

Indirect lineage conversion is a reprogramming methodology in which somatic cells transition through a plastic intermediate state of partially reprogrammed cells (pre-iPSC), induced by brief exposure to reprogramming factors, followed by differentiation in a specially developed chemical environment (artificial niche).

This method could be both more efficient and safer, since it does not seem to produce tumors or other undesirable genetic changes and results in much greater yield than other methods. However, the safety of these cells remains questionable. Since lineage conversion from pre-iPSC relies on the use of iPSC reprogramming conditions, a fraction of the cells could acquire pluripotent properties if they do not stop the de-differentation process in vitro or due to further de-differentiation in vivo.

Outer membrane glycoprotein 

A common feature of pluripotent stem cells is the specific nature of protein glycosylation of their outer membrane. That distinguishes them from most nonpluripotent cells, although not from white blood cells. The glycans on the stem cell surface respond rapidly to alterations in cellular state and signaling and are therefore ideal for identifying even minor changes in cell populations. Many stem cell markers are based on cell surface glycan epitopes, including the widely used markers SSEA-3, SSEA-4, Tra 1-60 and Tra 1-81. Suila Heli et al. speculate that in human stem cells, extracellular O-GlcNAc and extracellular O-LacNAc play a crucial role in the fine tuning of Notch signaling pathway - a highly conserved cell signaling system that regulates cell fate specification, differentiation, left–right asymmetry, apoptosis, somitogenesis, and angiogenesis, and plays a key role in stem cell proliferation (reviewed by Perdigoto and Bardin and Jafar-Nejad et al.)

Changes in outer membrane protein glycosylation are markers of cell states connected in some way with pluripotency and differentiation. The glycosylation change is apparently not just the result of the initialization of gene expression, but also performs as an important gene regulator involved in the acquisition and maintenance of the undifferentiated state.

For example, activation of glycoprotein ACA, linking glycosylphosphatidylinositol on the surface of the progenitor cells in human peripheral blood induces increased expression of genes Wnt, Notch-1, BMI1 and HOXB4 through a signaling cascade PI3K/Akt/mTor/PTEN and promotes the formation of a self-renewing population of hematopoietic stem cells.

Furthermore, dedifferentiation of progenitor cells induced by ACA-dependent signaling pathway leads to ACA-induced pluripotent stem cells, capable of differentiating in vitro into cells of all three germ layers. The study of lectins' ability to maintain a culture of pluripotent human stem cells has led to the discovery of lectin Erythrina crista-galli (ECA), which can serve as a simple and highly effective matrix for the cultivation of human pluripotent stem cells.

Reprogramming with a proteoglycan 
An alternative strategy to convert somatic cells to pluripotent states may be continuous stimulation of fibroblasts by a single ECM proteoglycan, fibromodulin. Such cells exhibit capability for skeletal muscle regeneration with markedly lower tumorigenic risk when compared to iPSCs.   The decreased tumorigenicity of such cells is related to CDKN2B upregulation during the recombinant human fibromodulin reprogramming process

Reprogramming through a physical approach 

Cell adhesion protein E-cadherin is indispensable for a robust pluripotent phenotype. During reprogramming for iPS cell generation, N-cadherin can replace function of E-cadherin. These functions of cadherins are not directly related to adhesion because sphere morphology helps maintaining the "stemness" of stem cells. Moreover, sphere formation, due to forced growth of cells on a low attachment surface, sometimes induces reprogramming. For example, neural progenitor cells can be generated from fibroblasts directly through a physical approach without introducing exogenous reprogramming factors.

Physical cues, in the form of parallel microgrooves on the surface of cell-adhesive substrates, can replace the effects of small-molecule epigenetic modifiers and significantly improve reprogramming efficiency. The mechanism relies on the mechanomodulation of the cells' epigenetic state. Specifically, "decreased histone deacetylase activity and upregulation of the expression of WD repeat domain 5 (WDR5) – a subunit of H3 methyltranferase – by microgrooved surfaces lead to increased histone H3 acetylation and methylation". Nanofibrous scaffolds with aligned fibre orientation produce effects similar to those produced by microgrooves, suggesting that changes in cell morphology may be responsible for modulation of the epigenetic state. 

Substrate rigidity is an important biophysical cue influencing neural induction and subtype specification. For example, soft substrates promote neuroepithelial conversion while inhibiting neural crest differentiation of hESCs in a BMP4-dependent manner. Mechanistic studies revealed a multi-targeted mechanotransductive process involving mechanosensitive Smad phosphorylation and nucleocytoplasmic shuttling, regulated by rigidity-dependent Hippo/YAP activities and actomyosin cytoskeleton integrity and contractility.
  
Mouse embryonic stem cells (mESCs) undergo self-renewal in the presence of the cytokine leukemia inhibitory factor (LIF). Following LIF withdrawal, mESCs differentiate, accompanied by an increase in cell–substratum adhesion and cell spreading. Restricted cell spreading in the absence of LIF by either culturing mESCs on chemically defined, weakly adhesive biosubstrates, or by manipulating the cytoskeleton, allowed the cells to remain in an undifferentiated and pluripotent state. The effect of restricted cell spreading on mESC self-renewal is not mediated by increased intercellular adhesion, as inhibition of mESC adhesion using a function blocking anti E-cadherin antibody or siRNA does not promote differentiation.
Possible mechanisms of stem cell fate predetermination by physical interactions with the extracellular matrix have been described.

A new method has been developed that turns cells into stem cells faster and more efficiently by 'squeezing' them using 3D microenvironment stiffness and density of the surrounding gel. The technique can be applied to a large number of cells to produce stem cells for medical purposes on an industrial scale.

Cells involved in the reprogramming process change morphologically as the process proceeds. This results in physical differences in adhesive forces among cells. Substantial differences in 'adhesive signature' between pluripotent stem cells, partially reprogrammed cells, differentiated progeny and somatic cells allowed the development of separation process for isolation of pluripotent stem cells in microfluidic devices, which is:
fast (separation takes less than 10 minutes);
efficient (separation results in a greater than 95 percent pure iPS cell culture); 
innocuous (cell survival rate is greater than 80 percent and the resulting cells retain normal transcriptional profiles, differentiation potential and karyotype).

Stem cells possess mechanical memory (they remember past physical signals) – with the Hippo signaling pathway factors: Yes-associated protein (YAP) and transcriptional coactivator with PDZ-binding domain (TAZ) acting as an intracellular mechanical rheostat—that stores information from past physical environments and influences the cells' fate.

Neural stem cells 

Stroke and many neurodegenerative disorders, such as Parkinson's disease, Alzheimer's disease, and amyotrophic lateral sclerosis, need cell replacement therapies. The successful use of converted neural cells (cNs) in transplantations opens a new avenue to treat such diseases. Nevertheless, induced neurons (iNs) directly converted from fibroblasts are terminally committed and exhibit very limited proliferative ability that may not provide enough autologous donor cells for transplantation. Self-renewing induced neural stem cells (iNSCs) provide additional advantages over iNs for both basic research and clinical applications.

For example, under specific growth conditions, mouse fibroblasts can be reprogrammed with a single factor, Sox2, to form iNSCs that self-renew in culture and after transplantation and can survive and integrate without forming tumors in mouse brains. INSCs can be derived from adult human fibroblasts by non-viral techniques, thus offering a safe method for autologous transplantation or for the development of cell-based disease models.

Neural chemically induced progenitor cells (ciNPCs) can be generated from mouse tail-tip fibroblasts and human urinary somatic cells without introducing exogenous factors, but - by a chemical cocktail, namely VCR (V, VPA, an inhibitor of HDACs; C, CHIR99021, an inhibitor of GSK-3 kinases and R, RepSox, an inhibitor of TGF beta signaling pathways), under a physiological hypoxic condition. Alternative cocktails with inhibitors of histone deacetylation, glycogen synthase kinase and TGF-β pathways (where: sodium butyrate (NaB) or Trichostatin A (TSA) could replace VPA, Lithium chloride (LiCl) or lithium carbonate (Li2CO3) could substitute CHIR99021, or Repsox may be replaced with SB-431542 or Tranilast) show similar efficacies for ciNPC induction.
Zhang, et al., also report highly efficient reprogramming of mouse fibroblasts into induced neural stem cell-like cells (ciNSLCs) using a cocktail of nine components.

Multiple methods of direct transformation of somatic cells into induced neural stem cells have been described.

Proof of principle experiments demonstrate that it is possible to convert transplanted human fibroblasts and human astrocytes directly in the brain that are engineered to express inducible forms of neural reprogramming genes, into neurons, when reprogramming genes (Ascl1, Brn2a and Myt1l) are activated after transplantation using a drug.

Astrocytes – the most common neuroglial brain cells, which contribute to scar formation in response to injury – can be directly reprogrammed in vivo to become functional neurons that form networks in mice without the need for cell transplantation. The researchers followed the mice for nearly a year to look for signs of tumor formation and reported finding none. The same researchers have turned scar-forming astrocytes into progenitor cells, called neuroblasts, that regenerated into neurons in the injured adult spinal cord.

Oligodendrocyte precursor cells 

Without myelin to insulate neurons, nerve signals quickly lose power. Diseases that attack myelin, such as multiple sclerosis, result in nerve signals that cannot propagate to nerve endings and as a consequence lead to cognitive, motor and sensory problems. Transplantation of oligodendrocyte precursor cells (OPCs), which can successfully create myelin sheaths around nerve cells, is a promising potential therapeutic response. Direct lineage conversion of mouse and rat fibroblasts into oligodendroglial cells provides a potential source of OPCs. Conversion by forced expression of both eight or of the three transcription factors Sox10, Olig2 and Zfp536, may provide such cells.

Cardiomyocytes 

Cell-based in vivo therapies may provide a transformative approach to augment vascular and muscle growth and to prevent non-contractile scar formation by delivering transcription factors or microRNAs to the heart. Cardiac fibroblasts, which represent 50% of the cells in the mammalian heart, can be reprogrammed into cardiomyocyte-like cells in vivo by local delivery of cardiac core transcription factors ( GATA4, MEF2C, TBX5 and for improved reprogramming plus ESRRG, MESP1, Myocardin and ZFPM2) after coronary ligation. These results implicated therapies that can directly remuscularize the heart without cell transplantation. However, the efficiency of such reprogramming turned out to be very low and the phenotype of received cardiomyocyte-like cells does not resemble those of a mature normal cardiomyocyte. Furthermore, transplantation of cardiac transcription factors into injured murine hearts resulted in poor cell survival and minimal expression of cardiac genes.

Meanwhile, advances in the methods of obtaining cardiac myocytes in vitro occurred. Efficient cardiac differentiation of human iPS cells gave rise to progenitors that were retained within infarcted rat hearts and reduced remodeling of the heart after ischemic damage.

The team of scientists, led by Sheng Ding, used a cocktail of nine chemicals (9C) for transdifferentiation of human skin cells into beating heart cells. With this method, more than 97% of the cells began beating, a characteristic of fully developed, healthy heart cells. The chemically induced cardiomyocyte-like cells (ciCMs) uniformly contracted and resembled human cardiomyocytes in their transcriptome, epigenetic, and electrophysiological properties. When transplanted into infarcted mouse hearts, 9C-treated fibroblasts were efficiently converted to ciCMs and developed into healthy-looking heart muscle cells within the organ. This chemical reprogramming approach, after further optimization, may offer an easy way to provide the cues that induce heart muscle to regenerate locally.

In another study, ischemic cardiomyopathy in the murine infarction model was targeted by iPS cell transplantation. It synchronized failing ventricles, offering a regenerative strategy to achieve resynchronization and protection from decompensation by dint of improved left ventricular conduction and contractility, reduced scarring and reversal of structural remodelling.
One protocol generated populations of up to 98% cardiomyocytes from hPSCs simply by modulating the canonical Wnt signaling pathway at defined time points in during differentiation, using readily accessible small molecule compounds.

Discovery of the mechanisms controlling the formation of cardiomyocytes led to the development of the drug ITD-1, which effectively clears the cell surface from TGF-β receptor type II and selectively inhibits intracellular TGF-β signaling. It thus selectively enhances the differentiation of uncommitted mesoderm to cardiomyocytes, but not to vascular smooth muscle and endothelial cells.

One project seeded decellularized mouse hearts with human iPSC-derived multipotential cardiovascular progenitor cells. The introduced cells migrated, proliferated and differentiated in situ into cardiomyocytes, smooth muscle cells and endothelial cells to reconstruct the hearts. In addition, the heart's extracellular matrix (the substrate of heart scaffold) signalled the human cells into becoming the specialised cells needed for proper heart function. After 20 days of perfusion with growth factors, the engineered heart tissues started to beat again and were responsive to drugs.

Reprogramming of cardiac fibroblasts into induced cardiomyocyte-like cells (iCMs) in situ represents a promising strategy for cardiac regeneration. Mice exposed in vivo, to three cardiac transcription factors GMT (Gata4, Mef2c, Tbx5) and the small-molecules: SB-431542 (the transforming growth factor (TGF)-β inhibitor), and XAV939 (the WNT inhibitor) for 2 weeks after myocardial infarction showed significantly improved reprogramming (reprogramming efficiency increased eight-fold) and cardiac function compared to those exposed to only GMT.

See also: review

Rejuvenation of the muscle stem cell
The elderly often with progressive muscle weakness and regenerative failure owing in part to elevated activity of the p38α and p38β mitogen-activated kinase pathway in senescent skeletal muscle stem cells. Subjecting such stem cells to transient inhibition of p38α and p38β in conjunction with culture on soft hydrogel substrates rapidly expands and rejuvenates them that result in the return of their strength.

In geriatric mice, resting satellite cells lose reversible quiescence by switching to an irreversible pre-senescence state, caused by derepression of p16INK4a (also called Cdkn2a). 
On injury, these cells fail to activate and expand, even in a youthful environment. p16INK4a silencing in geriatric satellite cells restores quiescence and muscle regenerative functions.

Myogenic progenitors for potential use in disease modeling or cell-based therapies targeting skeletal muscle could also be generated directly from induced pluripotent stem cells using free-floating spherical culture (EZ spheres) in a culture medium supplemented with high concentrations (100 ng/ml) of fibroblast growth factor-2 (FGF-2) and epidermal growth factor.

Hepatocytes 
Unlike current protocols for deriving hepatocytes from human fibroblasts, Saiyong Zhu et al., (2014) did not generate iPSCs but, using small molecules, cut short reprogramming to pluripotency to generate an induced multipotent progenitor cell (iMPC) state from which endoderm progenitor cells and subsequently hepatocytes (iMPC-Heps) were efficiently differentiated. After transplantation into an immune-deficient mouse model of human liver failure, iMPC-Heps proliferated extensively and acquired levels of hepatocyte function similar to those of human primary adult hepatocytes. iMPC-Heps did not form tumours, most probably because they never entered a pluripotent state.

These results establish the feasibility of significant liver repopulation of mice with human hepatocytes generated in vitro, which removes a long-standing roadblock on the path to autologous liver cell therapy.

A cocktail of small molecules, Y-27632, A-83-01 (a TGFβ kinase/activin receptor like kinase (ALK5) inhibitor), and CHIR99021 (potent inhibitor of  GSK-3), can convert rat and mouse mature hepatocytes in vitro into proliferative bipotent cells – CLiPs (chemically induced liver progenitors). CLiPs can differentiate into both mature hepatocytes and biliary epithelial cells that can form functional ductal structures.  In long-term culture CLiPs did not lose their proliferative capacity and their hepatic differentiation ability, and can repopulate chronically injured liver tissue.

Insulin-producing cells 
Complications of Diabetes mellitus such as cardiovascular diseases, retinopathy, neuropathy, nephropathy, and peripheral circulatory diseases depend on sugar dysregulation due to lack of insulin from pancreatic beta cells and can be lethal if they are not treated. One of the promising approaches to understand and cure diabetes is to use pluripotent stem cells (PSCs), including embryonic stem cells (ESCs) and induced PCSs (iPSCs). 
Unfortunately, human PSC-derived insulin-expressing cells resemble human fetal β cells rather than adult β cells. In contrast to adult β cells, fetal β cells seem functionally immature, as indicated by increased basal glucose secretion and lack of glucose stimulation and confirmed by RNA-seq of whose transcripts.

An alternative strategy is the conversion of fibroblasts towards distinct endodermal progenitor cell populations and, using cocktails of signalling factors, successful differentiation of these endodermal progenitor cells into functional beta-like cells both in vitro and in vivo.

Overexpression of the three transcription factors, PDX1 (required for pancreatic bud outgrowth and beta-cell maturation), NGN3 (required for endocrine precursor cell formation) and MAFA (for beta-cell maturation) combination (called PNM) can lead to the transformation of some cell types into a beta cell-like state. 
An accessible and abundant source of functional insulin-producing cells is intestine. PMN expression in human intestinal "organoids" stimulates the conversion of intestinal epithelial cells into β-like cells possibly acceptable for transplantation.

Nephron Progenitors 

Adult proximal tubule cells were directly transcriptionally reprogrammed to nephron progenitors of the embryonic kidney, using a pool of six genes of instructive transcription factors (SIX1, SIX2, OSR1, Eyes absent homolog 1(EYA1), Homeobox A11 (HOXA11) and Snail homolog 2 (SNAI2)) that activated genes consistent with a cap mesenchyme/nephron progenitor phenotype in the adult proximal tubule cell line.
The generation of such cells may lead to cellular therapies for adult renal disease. Embryonic kidney organoids placed into adult rat kidneys can undergo onward development and vascular development.

Blood vessel cells 

As blood vessels age, they often become abnormal in structure and function, thereby contributing to numerous age-associated diseases including myocardial infarction, ischemic stroke and atherosclerosis of arteries supplying the heart, brain and lower extremities. So, an important goal is to stimulate vascular growth for the collateral circulation to prevent the exacerbation of these diseases. Induced Vascular Progenitor Cells (iVPCs) are useful for cell-based therapy designed to stimulate coronary collateral growth. They were generated by partially reprogramming endothelial cells. The vascular commitment of iVPCs is related to the epigenetic memory of endothelial cells, which engenders them as cellular components of growing blood vessels. That is why, when iVPCs were implanted into myocardium, they engrafted in blood vessels and increased coronary collateral flow better than iPSCs, mesenchymal stem cells, or native endothelial cells.

Ex vivo genetic modification can be an effective strategy to enhance stem cell function. For example, cellular therapy employing genetic modification with Pim-1 kinase (a downstream effector of Akt, which positively regulates neovasculogenesis) of bone marrow–derived cells or human cardiac progenitor cells, isolated from failing myocardium results in durability of repair, together with the improvement of functional parameters of myocardial hemodynamic performance.

Stem cells extracted from fat tissue after liposuction may be coaxed into becoming progenitor smooth muscle cells (iPVSMCs) found in arteries and veins.

The 2D culture system of human iPS cells in conjunction with triple marker selection (CD34 (a surface glycophosphoprotein expressed on developmentally early embryonic fibroblasts), NP1 (receptor –  neuropilin 1) and KDR (kinase insert domain-containing receptor)) for the isolation of vasculogenic precursor cells from human iPSC, generated endothelial cells that, after transplantation, formed stable, functional mouse blood vessels in vivo, lasting for 280 days.

To treat infarction, it is important to prevent the formation of fibrotic scar tissue. This can be achieved in vivo by transient application of paracrine factors that redirect native heart progenitor stem cell contributions from scar tissue to cardiovascular tissue. For example, in a mouse myocardial infarction model, a single intramyocardial injection of human vascular endothelial growth factor A mRNA (VEGF-A modRNA), modified to escape the body's normal defense system, results in long-term improvement of heart function due to mobilization and redirection of epicardial progenitor cells toward cardiovascular cell types.

Blood stem cells

Red blood cells 
RBC transfusion is necessary for many patients. However, to date the supply of RBCs remains labile. In addition, transfusion risks infectious disease transmission. A large supply of safe RBCs generated in vitro would help to address this issue. Ex vivo erythroid cell generation may provide alternative transfusion products to meet present and future clinical requirements. Red blood cells (RBC)s generated in vitro from mobilized CD34 positive cells have normal survival when transfused into an autologous recipient. RBC produced in vitro contained exclusively fetal hemoglobin (HbF), which rescues the functionality of these RBCs. In vivo the switch of fetal to adult hemoglobin was observed after infusion of nucleated erythroid precursors derived from iPSCs. Although RBCs do not have nuclei and therefore can not form a tumor, their immediate erythroblasts precursors have nuclei. The terminal maturation of erythroblasts into functional RBCs requires a complex remodeling process that ends with extrusion of the nucleus and the formation of an enucleated RBC. Cell reprogramming often disrupts enucleation. Transfusion of in vitro-generated RBCs or erythroblasts does not sufficiently protect against tumor formation.

The aryl hydrocarbon receptor (AhR) pathway (which has been shown to be involved in the promotion of cancer cell development) plays an important role in normal blood cell development. AhR activation in human hematopoietic progenitor cells (HPs) drives an unprecedented expansion of HPs, megakaryocyte- and erythroid-lineage cells. 
See also Concise Review:
The SH2B3 gene encodes a negative regulator of cytokine signaling and naturally occurring loss-of-function variants in this gene increase RBC counts in vivo. Targeted suppression of SH2B3 in primary human hematopoietic stem and progenitor cells enhanced the maturation and overall yield of in-vitro-derived RBCs. Moreover, inactivation of SH2B3 by CRISPR/Cas9 genome editing in human pluripotent stem cells allowed enhanced erythroid cell expansion with preserved differentiation.
(See also overview.)

Platelets 
Platelets help prevent hemorrhage in thrombocytopenic patients and patients with thrombocythemia. A significant problem for multitransfused patients is refractoriness to platelet transfusions. Thus, the ability to generate platelet products ex vivo and platelet products lacking HLA antigens in serum-free media would have clinical value.
An RNA interference-based mechanism used a lentiviral vector to express short-hairpin RNAi targeting β2-microglobulin transcripts in CD34-positive cells. Generated platelets demonstrated an 85% reduction in class I HLA antigens. These platelets appeared to have normal function in vitro

One clinically applicable strategy for the derivation of functional platelets from human iPSC involves the establishment of stable immortalized megakaryocyte progenitor cell lines (imMKCLs) through doxycycline-dependent overexpression of BMI1 and BCL-XL. The resulting imMKCLs can be expanded in culture over extended periods (4–5 months), even after cryopreservation. Halting the overexpression (by the removal of doxycycline from the medium) of c-MYC, BMI1 and BCL-XL in growing imMKCLs led to the production of CD42b+ platelets with functionality comparable to that of native platelets on the basis of a range of assays in vitro and in vivo.
Thomas et al., describe a forward programming strategy relying on the concurrent exogenous expression of 3 transcription factors: GATA1, FLI1 and TAL1. The forward programmed megakaryocytes proliferate and differentiate in culture for several months with megakaryocyte purity over 90% reaching up to 2x105 mature megakaryocytes per input hPSC. Functional platelets are generated throughout the culture allowing the prospective collection of several transfusion units from as few as one million starting hPSCs. See also overview

Immune cells 

A specialised type of white blood cell, known as cytotoxic T lymphocytes (CTLs), are produced by the immune system and are able to recognise specific markers on the surface of various infectious or tumour cells, causing them to launch an attack to kill the harmful cells. Thence, immunotherapy with functional antigen-specific T cells has potential as a therapeutic strategy for combating many cancers and viral infections. However, cell sources are limited, because they are produced in small numbers naturally and have a short lifespan.

A potentially efficient approach for generating antigen-specific CTLs is to revert mature immune T cells into iPSCs, which possess indefinite proliferative capacity in vitro and after their multiplication to coax them to redifferentiate back into T cells.

Another method combines iPSC and chimeric antigen receptor (CAR) technologies to generate human T cells targeted to CD19, an antigen expressed by malignant B cells, in tissue culture. This approach of generating therapeutic human T cells may be useful for cancer immunotherapy and other medical applications.

Invariant natural killer T (iNKT) cells have great clinical potential as adjuvants for cancer immunotherapy. iNKT cells act as innate T lymphocytes and serve as a bridge between the innate and acquired immune systems. They augment anti-tumor responses by producing interferon-gamma (IFN-γ). The approach of collection, reprogramming/dedifferentiation, re-differentiation and injection has been proposed for related tumor treatment.

Dendritic cells (DC) are specialized to control T-cell responses. DC with appropriate genetic modifications may survive long enough to stimulate antigen-specific CTL and after that be eliminated. DC-like antigen-presenting cells obtained from human induced pluripotent stem cells can serve as a source for vaccination therapy.

CCAAT/enhancer binding protein-α (C/EBPα) induces transdifferentiation of B cells into macrophages at high efficiencies and enhances reprogramming into iPS cells when co-expressed with transcription factors Oct4, Sox2, Klf4 and Myc. with a 100-fold increase in iPS cell reprogramming efficiency, involving 95% of the population.
Furthermore, C/EBPa can convert selected human B cell lymphoma and leukemia cell lines into macrophage-like cells at high efficiencies, impairing the cells' tumor-forming capacity.

Thymic epithelial cells rejuvenation 
The thymus is the first organ to deteriorate as people age. This shrinking is one of the main reasons the immune system becomes less effective with age. Diminished expression of the thymic epithelial cell transcription factor FOXN1 has been implicated as a component of the mechanism regulating age-related involution.

Clare Blackburn and colleagues show that established age-related thymic involution can be reversed by forced upregulation of just one transcription factor – FOXN1 in the thymic epithelial cells in order to promote rejuvenation, proliferation and differentiation of these cells into fully functional thymic epithelium.
This rejuvenation and increased proliferation was accompanied by upregulation of genes that promote cell cycle progression (cyclin D1, ΔNp63, FgfR2IIIb) and that are required in the thymic epithelial cells to promote specific aspects of T cell development (Dll4, Kitl, Ccl25, Cxcl12, Cd40, Cd80, Ctsl, Pax1).  In the future, this method  may be widely used to enhance immune function and combat Inflammaging in patients by rejuvenating the thymus  in situ .

Mesenchymal stem cells

Induction 

Mesenchymal stem/stromal cells (MSCs) are under investigation for applications in cardiac, renal, neural, joint and bone repair, as well as in inflammatory conditions and hemopoietic cotransplantation. This is because of their immunosuppressive properties and ability to differentiate into a wide range of mesenchymal-lineage tissues. MSCs are typically harvested from adult bone marrow or fat, but these require painful invasive procedures and are low-frequency sources, making up only 0.001–0.01% of bone marrow cells and 0.05% in liposuction aspirates. Of concern for autologous use, in particular in the elderly most in need of tissue repair, MSCs decline in quantity and quality with age.

IPSCs could be obtained by the cells rejuvenation of even centenarians. Because iPSCs can be harvested free of ethical constraints and culture can be expanded indefinitely, they are an advantageous source of MSCs. IPSC treatment with SB-431542 leads to rapid and uniform MSC generation from human iPSCs. (SB-431542 is an inhibitor of activin/TGF- pathways by blocking phosphorylation of ALK4, ALK5 and ALK7 receptors.) These iPS-MSCs may lack teratoma-forming ability, display a normal stable karyotype in culture and exhibit growth and differentiation characteristics that closely resemble those of primary MSCs. It has potential for in vitro scale-up, enabling MSC-based therapies. MSC derived from iPSC have the capacity to aid periodontal regeneration and are a promising source of readily accessible stem cells for use in the clinical treatment of periodontitis.

Lai et al., & Lu report the chemical method to generate MSC-like cells (iMSCs), from human primary dermal fibroblasts using six chemical inhibitors (SP600125, SB202190, Go6983, Y-27632, PD0325901, and CHIR99021) with or without 3 growth factors (transforming growth factor-β (TGF-β), basic fibroblast growth factor (bFGF), and leukemia inhibitory factor (LIF)). The chemical cocktail directly converts human fibroblasts to iMSCs with a monolayer culture in 6 days, and the conversion rate was approximately 38%.

Besides cell therapy in vivo, the culture of human mesenchymal stem cells can be used in vitro for mass-production of exosomes, which are ideal vehicles for drug delivery.

Dedifferentiated adipocytes 

Adipose tissue, because of its abundance and relatively less invasive harvest methods, represents a source of mesenchymal stem cells (MSCs). Unfortunately, liposuction aspirates are only 0.05% MSCs. However, a large amount of mature adipocytes, which in general have lost their proliferative abilities and therefore are typically discarded, can be easily isolated from the adipose cell suspension and dedifferentiated into lipid-free fibroblast-like cells, named dedifferentiated fat (DFAT) cells. DFAT cells re-establish active proliferation ability and express multipotent capacities. Compared with adult stem cells, DFAT cells show unique advantages in abundance, isolation and homogeneity. Under proper induction culture in vitro or proper environment in vivo, DFAT cells could demonstrate adipogenic, osteogenic, chondrogenic and myogenic potentials. They could also exhibit perivascular characteristics and elicit neovascularization.

Chondrogenic cells 

Cartilage is the connective tissue responsible for frictionless joint movement. Its degeneration ultimately results in complete loss of joint function in the late stages of osteoarthritis. As an avascular and hypocellular tissue, cartilage has a limited capacity for self-repair. Chondrocytes are the only cell type in cartilage, in which they are surrounded by the extracellular matrix that they secrete and assemble.

One method of producing cartilage is to induce it from iPS cells. Alternatively, it is possible to convert fibroblasts directly into induced chondrogenic cells (iChon) without an intermediate iPS cell stage, by inserting three reprogramming factors (c-MYC, KLF4 and SOX9). Human iChon cells expressed marker genes for chondrocytes (type II collagen) but not fibroblasts.

Implanted into defects created in the articular cartilage of rats, human iChon cells survived to form cartilaginous tissue for at least four weeks, with no tumors. The method makes use of c-MYC, which is thought to have a major role in tumorigenesis and employs a retrovirus to introduce the reprogramming factors, excluding it from unmodified use in human therapy.

Sources of cells for reprogramming 

The most frequently used sources for reprogramming are blood cells and fibroblasts, obtained by biopsy of the skin, but taking cells from urine is less invasive. The latter method does not require a biopsy or blood sampling. As of 2013, urine-derived stem cells had been differentiated into endothelial, osteogenic, chondrogenic, adipogenic, skeletal myogenic and neurogenic lineages, without forming teratomas. Therefore, their epigenetic memory is suited to reprogramming into iPS cells. However, few cells appear in urine, only low conversion efficiencies had been achieved and the risk of bacterial contamination is relatively high.

Another promising source of cells for reprogramming are mesenchymal stem cells derived from human hair follicles.

The origin of somatic cells used for reprogramming may influence the efficiency of reprogramming, the functional properties of the resulting induced stem cells and the ability to form tumors.

IPSCs retain an epigenetic memory of their tissue of origin, which impacts their differentiation potential.
This epigenetic memory does not necessarily manifest itself at the pluripotency stage – iPSCs derived from different tissues exhibit proper morphology, express pluripotency markers and are able to differentiate into the three embryonic layers in vitro and in vivo. However, this epigenetic memory may manifest during re-differentiation into specific cell types that require the specific loci bearing residual epigenetic marks.

See also 

 Transdifferentiation
 Examples of in vitro transdifferentiation by lineage-instructive approach
 Examples of in vitro transdifferentiation by initial epigenetic activation phase approach
 Examples of in vivo transdifferentiation by lineage-instructive approach
 Injury induced stem cell niches
 Transcription factors
 Growth factors
 Pioneer factors
 Cellular differentiation
 CAF-1

References

Further reading 

 
 
 
 
 
 
 
 
 
 
 
 
 
 Nobel Prize in Physiology or Medicine 2012 Awarded for Discovery That Mature Cells Can Be Reprogrammed to Become Pluripotent
 
 
  a 50-fold increase in efficiency; small volumes; differentiation into desired cells in the same platform
 
 
 
 
 

 
Biotechnology
Stem cells
Epigenetics
Biological engineering
Regenerative biomedicine